The following are the records of Costa Rica in Olympic weightlifting. Records are maintained in each weight class for the snatch lift, clean and jerk lift, and the total for both lifts by the Federación Halterofilica Costarricense.

Men

Women

References

Costa Rica
Olympic weightlifting
weightlifting